Temescal Canyon High School is a public high school part of the Lake Elsinore Unified School District. Though it is located in Lake Elsinore, California, it also serves the areas of Canyon Lake and Horsethief Canyon. The school was opened for the 1991–1992 school year, graduating its first class in 1994.

School layout
Temescal Canyon is divided into buildings labeled as "hundred"—four hundred, five hundred, etc.—and includes portable classrooms and permanent structures. The school was partially completed when it opened, but was finished in 1999.

"Hundred" Buildings
Built on what once were basketball courts, the 400 building houses numerous types of classes such as math and music appreciation. The 450 building, located on the west side of the school, houses computer labs used for freshman foundation instruction, computer classes, and English Language Development classes. The 500 building, between the 550 and 700 buildings, includes a small set of four science classrooms. The 550 building is one of the campus' two story buildings, and is the site of English, social sciences and science classes.

The school's hub, the 600 building, is one of the original structures. It houses the library, media center and history and English classrooms. The math building–the 700–is also known as the Kathy Paap. The second two-story building on campus serves elective classes (such as ceramics, pottery and photography) and foreign language instruction. The 900 building, nestled in the back of the campus, also houses elective instruction, including materials labs, a TV studio and an auto shop.

The school plant includes two gymnasia, the old Small Gym and the newer Big Gym, which was completed in 1999. The small gym is mainly used for indoor physical education and dances and is connected to the school cafeteria and the school kitchen. The Big Gym, also known as Thunderdome, is primarily used for sports like basketball and volleyball; it also houses school assemblies and pep rallies. The letters T-C-H-S are spelled out on the gym bleachers.

The school has a set of three athletic fields. The softball and baseball fields are located at the northwest corner of the campus. The soccer field is located below the Big Gym, and fills the space between the baseball and football stadiums. The football stadium is located on the southwest corner of the school campus, and has been renovated with new viewing stands and synthetic turf.

The administration building includes the bookkeeping office, athletic director, counseling office, career center and administrative offices usually off-limits for students.

There are three parking lots, two of which are restricted for students. One is located near the 800, but the largest one is near the campus stadium, and includes spaces for office personnel and spaces reserved for seniors.  These spots are randomly assigned to a certain number of seniors in a lottery-style choosing. Students who obtain these spaces must pay an extra fee but are given a special decal and are able to paint their spaces on senior paint-party day. The rest of the staff park in the lot behind the 900, which students are not allowed to use.

Students have numerous places to gather during break and lunch. Due to the layout of the school, quads are formed in between the buildings. The "Senior Quad" is elevated above the walkways in the northwest corner of the 600 building and includes a tarp. The "Freshman Quad" is located right outside of the lunchroom and includes a tarp. Less busy quads are those formed at the 550 and 800 buildings.

Academics
The school offers the standard classes in addition to Advanced Placement and International Baccalaureate (AP)(IB) courses:
 World History
 US History
 Art History
 English Literature
 English Language
 Physics
 Chemistry
 Biology
 Calculus
 Spanish
 Government and Politics
 Environmental Science
 Statistics
 Psychology

International Baccalaureate Courses:
  English Literature HL
  Language B (Spanish) HL & SL
  History of the Americas HL
  Design and Technology HL
  Chemistry SL
  Biology SL
  Mathematics HL & SL
  Math Studies SL
  Theatre HL
  Visual Arts HL
  Dance HL
  Music HL
  Theory of Knowledge

In addition to AP classes, Advanced English 9 and 10 are offered, as well as honors classes.

Temescal Canyon is a California Distinguished School for the years 2001 and 2007.

IB World School

Temescal Canyon High School has been authorized to offer the International Baccalaureate Diploma Programme at the start of the 2012–13 academic year. As LEUSD's first and only high school to pursue IB World School status, TCHS officially ranks among 3,313 schools worldwide that are certified under the International Baccalaureate trademark.
To receive an IB Diploma, students must pass a written exam given at the end of the program.

Clubs

Associated Student Body
Temescal Canyon High School has an extraordinary, top ranking ASB Program. The Associated Student Body is responsible for planning many school events, academic recognition, teacher appreciation, Link Crew (Freshmen involvement program), and Titan Pride (including blue hole). Its leaders devote their time to make Temescal Canyon a place where all students and staff feel safe, empowered, encouraged and supported. Over the past four years, a new class was added each year resulting in four current leadership classes. The House of Representatives class is responsible for all academic recognition and execution of our Renaissance program. This class is run by Ms. Melissa Fink. The Executive Assembly class is responsible for running the ASB program, sports recognition, Titan pride, Winter Formal, pep rallies, and sound and video. This class is run by Mrs. Cari Strange. The Link Crew class is responsible for assisting the Freshmen class in transitioning to their move into high school. They strive to make the freshmen feel welcome to Temescal and support them through activities, tutoring, etc. This class is run by Mrs. Jill Carter. The Senate class is responsible for staff appreciation, special activities, peer buddies (special education program), Homecoming, community service, recycling program, and random acts of kindness (RAOK). This class is also run by Mrs. Cari Strange.

Temescal Canyon's ASB program is a CADA/CASL member school and was awarded with the California Association of Student Leaders Outstanding Activities Program Award for the 2011/12 school year. The leadership program keeps growing and getting better. Through curriculum days led by Cari Strange the students are able to learn valuable life and leadership skills that they are able to apply hands on throughout their time in ASB. Leaders of this program have accomplished many great awards and been recognized in many ways. One student, Nick Fadgen, has taken his leadership to the state level and is now a member of the CASL State Board and will be representing Temescal Canyon's ASB Program while planning the CASL State Conference that has attendance of over 2000 leaders from all over California.

Titan TV
Titan TV is a weekly broadcast created exclusively for this school. The weekly often talks about dates on sports events, school events, and teacher interviews. The daily announcements talks about dates, clubs, E.T.C.

Sports

School tradition

As in many other high schools, pep rallies are held before big games and to celebrate certain things, such as senior walk-in (the first pep rally of the year in which the senior class walks in front of the entire school wearing decorated crowns) and academics (the last pep rally of the year in which the teacher of the year and valedictorians are announced). The Titans formerly competed in the Southwestern League, but moved to the Sunbelt League, which also features rivals Elsinore High School and Lakeside High School, for the 2010/11 school year due to the school's size.

Blue Hole
The "Blue Hole", a school-wide pep club, forms a large part of Temescal Canyon student culture. Formed in 2002 by members of the football team who wanted something to do during the offseason, the Club is now an official school club open to all students. Members purchased TC-Blue T-shirts with a "6" on the back (symbolizing the 6th man) and "Blue Hole" in large, bold lettering on the front. They appear at basketball games, home and away, and sit behind the opposing team's bench. From beginning to end, they stand and chant phrases, hoping to mentally defeat the opponents as well as motivate their fellow student-athletes. Their antics include repeatedly heckling individual players with chants of "air ball",  the turn-over countdown, and other attacks on play or attitude. The antics even target the officials, as poor calls are followed by boos and members dress as blind referees and parade the sidelines after a questionable call. The Southwestern League prompted new regulations prohibiting the club from sitting behind the opposition bench and name calling. The Club's rowdiness has been credited to some of the success of the boys' basketball team. The Blue Hole has also moved onto the football field, where they sit in a specially-marked "blue hole section", a seating area in which the bleachers are painted blue. Standing throughout the entire game, the Blue Hole cheers and sings, capping it all off with an  "It's All Over" chant at the end of a victory.

Band
The Titan Thunder Regiment now has an extensive program including Wind Ensemble, Symphonic band, Orchestra, Marching Band, Jazz Ensemble, Small Ensemble, Color Guard, Drum Line and Percussion Ensemble.  Members participate in Marching Band during the first semester and many select from one or more of the remaining ensembles and bands during the second semester.

The Titan Thunder Regiment performs an original field show each year at home football games and at field show competitions in Southern California. The Regiment regularly ranks near the top of its divisions.

The Titan Thunder Regiment is currently in class AA for parade band reviews, and 4A in field show competitions and tournaments.

As of the end of the season in 2017, the Marching Regiment is the 9th best high school parade band in Southern California.

CIF
•The football team won the CIF Championships of 1995.

•The 2010/11 wrestling team recorded a team record of 21 wins and no losses, leading to an undefeated CIF victory.

•The 2011/12 girls' water polo team went on to win a back to back CIF Championship.

•The wrestling team earned their second CIF-SS title in 2013 beating Rowland High School in the Division 3 Dual Meet Wrestling Championship.

•In 2015, The girls' soccer team won their very first CIF-SS title against league rivals Paloma Valley with the score of 2-1 at the Division 6 CIF-SS Championship.

•In 2017, the boys' water polo team won CIF undefeated and is undefeated through eight league seasons.

•In 2017, the girls' tennis team won the CIF championship against Orange.

Fall Season (September–November)
 Football
 Marching band
 Girls' volleyball
 Cross country
 Girls' golf
 Girls' tennis
 Boys' water polo

Winter Season (December–February)
 Girls' water polo
 Boys' basketball
 Girls' basketball
 Girls' soccer
 Boys' soccer
 Wrestling

Spring Season (March–May)
 Boys' golf
 Baseball
 Softball
 Boys' track and field
 Girls' track and field
 Boys' swimming
 Girls' swimming
 Boys' tennis

Notable alumni
 Tom Malone (1998–2002) – Punter for the USC Trojans and the St. Louis Rams
 Norman Xiong (2014-2017)

References

External links
Official Temescal Canyon High School website
Official Titan Thunder Regiment website
 

High schools in Riverside County, California
Public high schools in California
1991 establishments in California